Bi Sidi Souleymane (July 20, 1962 – March 25, 2021), also known as Sidiki Abass, was a leader of the Central African Republic (CAR)-based militia group Return, Reclamation, Rehabilitation (3R). The group has killed, tortured, raped, or forcibly displaced thousands of people since 2015, and Souleymane himself has also directly participated in torture. On May 21, 2019, in northwest CAR’s Ouham-Pendé province, 3R killed at least 46 unarmed civilians.

On August 7, 2020, Souleymane was sanctioned by the United States government under Executive Order 13667 and listed in the Specially Designated Nationals and Blocked Persons List.

On April 2, 2021, a statement from the 3R revealed that Souleymane had died on March 25, from injuries he sustained during an attack in the town of Bossembélé in November 2020.

References

1962 births
2021 deaths
Specially Designated Nationals and Blocked Persons List
People of the Central African Republic Civil War
People killed in the Central African Republic Civil War
African warlords
People from Ouham-Pendé
Violence against women in the Central African Republic